Boris Andriyovich Shramko (1921 – 8 July 2012) was a Ukrainian historian and professor of history.

Excavations at Bilske Horodyshche (Більське городище) near the village of Bilsk (between Poltava and Sumy) in the Ukraine have led to suggestions by archaeologist Boris Shramko and others identifying it as the Scythian capital Gelonus. It is strategically situated on the exact boundary between the steppe and forest-steppe.

Bibliography 
 Мурзін В., Ролле Р., Супруненко О. Більське городище. – Київ-Гамбург-Полтава, 1999. – 104 с.
 Шрамко Б.А. Крепость скифского времени у с.Бельск – город Гелон // Скифский мир. – К., 1975.
 Шрамко Б.А. Бельское городище скифской эпохи (город Гелон). – К., 1987. – 182 с.
 Більське городище в контексті вивчення пам’яток раннього залізного віку Європи. – Полтава, 1996. – 408 с.

Footnotes

1921 births
20th-century Ukrainian historians
People from Gomel
National University of Kharkiv alumni
2012 deaths
Soviet historians
Recipients of the Order of Bohdan Khmelnytsky, 3rd class